Simeulue  is an island of Indonesia,  off the west coast of Sumatra. It covers an area of 1754 square kilometres (677 square miles), including minor offshore islands. It had a population of 80,674 at the 2010 census and 92,865 at the 2020 census. The official estimate as at mid 2021 was 93,762. Its capital is Sinabang.

Simeulue was once a part of West Aceh Regency but was split off in 1999 and became a separate Simeulue Regency.

Demographics 
From the ethnic point of view the inhabitants of Simeulue are similar to the people of neighboring Nias Island. Two languages and a number of dialects are spoken on the island: Simeulue and Sigulai, which are different from the languages spoken in the north of Sumatra. The majority of the island's population is Muslim.

History
Simeulue was historically known to European mariners as "Hog Island" and served as a landfall for ships seeking ports on the west coast of Sumatra for the pepper trade. It was also known as "Pulo Oo", or "Coconut Island". Some historians suggest the fictional islands of Lilliput and Blefuscu in Gulliver's Travels (1726) might be described as two Simeulue's remote islands in the Indian Ocean: Devayan and Sigulai.

2004 Indian Ocean earthquake
Simeulue was close to the epicenter of the 9.3 magnitude 26 December 2004 earthquake.

On 28 March 2005, an 8.7 magnitude earthquake struck with its epicenter just off the south end of the island. During the earthquake, Simeulue rose at least 2 metres (6 ft) on the western coast; this left the flat top of its coral reefs above high tide. On the east coast, the land was submerged, with seawater flooding fields and settlements.

Although Simeulue Island was only 60 kilometers from the epicenter of the 2004 earthquake, whereas Banda Aceh – the city that was hit hardest by the tsunami – was about 250 kilometers away, only six residents on Simeulue died, while the remaining 70,000 survived. This was apparently thanks to local wisdom called 'smong', which dictates that after an earthquake, if the tide suddenly recedes, people should evacuate to higher ground as soon as possible, based on the experience of a major tsunami in 1907.

Tourism 
Over the past ten years Simeulue has become a growingly popular surfing destination.  The southwest-facing portion of the island holds multiple world class waves and a handful of surf resorts have popped up in recent years.  As surfers have continued to explore throughout Indonesia over the past 40 years since traveling surfers first arrived to Bali, surfing has expanded to more and more of Indonesia's many islands.  Simeulue has been one of the last of these islands with quality waves to catch on, and still remains as one of surfing's last frontiers.

See also

 Simeulue language
 Simeulue scops owl

References

External links

Islands of Sumatra
Islands of the Indian Ocean
Populated places in Indonesia